Mitochondrial chaperone BCS1 (BCS1L), also known as BCS1 homolog, ubiquinol-cytochrome c reductase complex chaperone (h-BCS1), is a protein that in humans is encoded by the BCS1L gene. BCS1L is a chaperone protein involved in the assembly of Ubiquinol Cytochrome c Reductase (complex III), which is located in the inner mitochondrial membrane and is part of the electron transport chain. Mutations in this gene are associated with mitochondrial complex III deficiency (nuclear, 1), GRACILE syndrome, and Bjoernstad syndrome.

Structure 
BCS1L is located on the q arm of chromosome 2 in position 35 and has 10 exons. The BCS1L gene produces a 47.5 kDa protein composed of 419 amino acids. The protein encoded by BCS1L belongs to the AAA ATPase family, BCS1 subfamily. BCS1L is a phosphoprotein and chaperone for Ubiquinol Cytochrome c Reductase assembly. It contains a nucleotide binding site for ATP-binding. BCS1L does not contain a mitochondrial targeting sequence but experimental studies confirm that it is imported into mitochondria. A conserved domain at the N-terminus of BCS1L is responsible for the import and intramitochondrial sorting. Associating to the inner mitochondrial membrane, BCS1L has a transmembrane domain in between two topological domains, passing through the inner mitochondrial membrane once. The majority of the protein is in the mitochondrial matrix. Several alternatively spliced transcripts encoding two different isoforms have been described.

Function 
BCS1L encodes a protein that is located in the inner mitochondrial membrane and involved in the assembly of Ubiquinol Cytochrome c Reductase (complex III). Complex III plays an important role in the mitochondrial respiratory chain by transferring electrons from the Rieske iron-sulfur protein to cytochrome c. BCS1L is essential for this process through its role in the maintenance of mitochondrial tubular networks, respiratory chain assembly, and formation of the LETM1 complex.

Clinical Significance 
Variants of BCS1L have been associated with mitochondrial complex III deficiency, nuclear 1, GRACILE syndrome, and Bjoernstad syndrome. Mitochondrial complex III deficiency, nuclear 1 is a disorder of the mitochondrial respiratory chain resulting in reduced complex III activity and highly variable clinical features usually resulting in multi-system organ failure. Clinical features may include mitochondrial encephalopathy, psychomotor retardation, ataxia, severe failure to thrive, liver dysfunction, renal tubulopathy, muscle weakness, exercise intolerance, lactic acidosis, hypotonia, seizures, and optic atrophy. Pathogenic mutations have included R45C, R56X, T50A, R73C, P99L, R155P, V353M, G129R, R183C, F368I, and S277N. These mutations tend to affect the ATP-binding residues of BCS1L.

Growth retardation, aminoaciduria, cholestasis, iron overload, lactic acidosis, and early death (GRACILE) is a recessively inherited lethal disease that results in mutli-system organ failure. GRACILE is characterized by fetal growth retardation, lactic acidosis, aminoaciduria, cholestasis, and abnormalities in iron metabolism. Pathogenic mutations have included S78G, R144Q, and V327A.

Bjoernstad syndrome is an autosomal recessive disease primarily affecting hearing. This disease is characterized by congenital hearing loss and twisted hairs, a condition known as pili torti, in which hair shafts are flattened at irregular intervals and twisted 180 degrees from the normal axis, making the hair extremely brittle. Pathogenic mutations have included Y301N, R184C, G35R, R114W, R183H, Q302E, and R306H. These mutations tend to affect the protein-protein interactions of BCS1L.

Interactions 
BCS1L has 11 protein-protein interactions with 8 of them being co-complex interactions. BCS1L has been found to interact with LETM1, DNAJA1, and DDX24.

See also 
 Björnstad syndrome
 GRACILE syndrome

References

External links

Further reading 

 
 
 
 
 
 
 
 

Protein domains